Jean Paquet (born 12 October 1964) is a Canadian former biathlete who competed in the 1992 Winter Olympics.

References

1964 births
Living people
Canadian male biathletes
Olympic biathletes of Canada
Biathletes at the 1992 Winter Olympics